Subdivisions of Bulgaria:
 Provinces of Bulgaria – first level
 City of Sofia – first level
 Municipalities of Bulgaria

History 
After the liberation of Bulgaria, the country administrative were divided to 12 provinces (Bulgarian: губернии).

Okrazhiya and departments 
After 1880 Kingdom of Bulgaria were separated to 21 Okrazhiya (in English: regimental). During the years to 1885 Eastern Rumelia, where were living Bulgarians (around 92%) administrative separated to 6 departments.

NUTS

External links
 http://www.nsi.bg/nrnm/index.php?i=1&ezik=en